Nauset Beach Dunes is a mountain in Barnstable County, Massachusetts. It is located northeast of Chatham Port in the Town of Chatham. Great Hill is located southwest of Nauset Beach Dunes.

References

Mountains of Massachusetts
Mountains of Barnstable County, Massachusetts